Lord Allan Jay Quinto Velasco (born November 9, 1977) is a Filipino politician and lawyer who served as the Speaker of the House of Representatives from October 12, 2020 to June 2022. He is concurrently serving as the Representative of Marinduque's lone district since 2016, and previously from 2010 to 2013. He previously served as the Marinduque chapter president of the Integrated Bar of the Philippines, and Marinduque provincial administrator under Governor Jose Antonio Carrion.

Personal life

Early life and family
Velasco was born on November 9, 1977. His father is lawyer Presbitero Velasco Jr., who served as an Associate Justice of the Supreme Court from 2006 to 2018, and has been governor of their home province Marinduque since 2019. His mother, Lorna Quinto Velasco, originally a nurse, ventured into politics: first as the Representative of Ang Mata'y Aalagaan (AMA or MATA) party-list from 2013 to 2016, and from 2016 onwards as mayor of Torrijos, Marinduque. His sister, Tricia Nicole Velasco-Catera, is also a lawyer. Velasco-Catera was their father's judicial staff head in the Supreme Court, and their mother's chief of staff in the House. She was AMA/MATA party-list's representative from 2016 to 2019.

Velasco was educated in Manila, earning his Bachelor of Science in business management from De La Salle University, and his Bachelor of Laws from the University of Santo Tomas. He was admitted to the Integrated Bar of the Philippines (IBP) in 2005.

Velasco married Rowena "Wen" Amara on September 21, 2012. They have five children: Sophia, Bella, Ramon, Sara, and Lord Jose Maria. Wen chairs the Pilipinong May Puso Foundation, a charity launched in 2016 in honor of Soledad Duterte, President Rodrigo Duterte's late mother. Several high-profile personalities attended the baptism of their daughter Sara in September 2019: President Duterte, businessman Ramon Ang, senators Bong Go and Sonny Angara, former senator Bongbong Marcos, Secretary of Public Works and Highways Mark Villar, and Quezon City mayor Joy Belmonte.

Friendship with the Dutertes
The Velascos grew close to Rodrigo Duterte when they supported his presidential campaign. On Christmas of 2016, the Velascos celebrated at the Duterte family's house in Davao City. The Velasco couple also organized celebrations for the President's birthday in 2017 and 2018. The President and his daughter, Davao City mayor Sara Duterte, were also guests at Velasco's 2018 birthday party. Velasco considers Sara Duterte his "big bike riding buddy". In the 2019 election, the President endorsed the Velasco family, who were running for various offices in Marinduque.

Political career

Provincial Administrator of Marinduque (2008–2009)
Early in his law career, he served as the chapter president of the IBP in Marinduque. In January 2008, he was appointed as the provincial administrator of Marinduque by Governor Jose Antonio Carrion. He also headed the Provincial Tourism Council where he focused on "sports adventure and community-based tourism". He resigned as provincial administrator on December 1, 2009 to file his candidacy for the province's lone House seat.

House of Representatives (2010–present)
In the 2010 elections, running under Lakas–Kampi, Velasco defeated Edmundo Reyes, the son of then-incumbent representative Carmencita Reyes. Velasco became the first elected government official in his family.

Velasco was defeated in his bid for re-election in 2013 by Regina Ongsiako Reyes, daughter of incumbent Governor Carmencita Reyes, but Velasco disputed Reyes' victory by noting that Reyes was a United States citizen during the election and was thus ineligible to hold the office. Both the Supreme Court and the COMELEC upheld Velasco's protest. Despite this, House Speaker Feliciano Belmonte maintained that a decision to remove Reyes from her seat is up to the House Electoral Tribunal, where Velasco's case to remove her was still pending. Velasco was later proclaimed as the legitimate representative of Marinduque's lone district and assumed office on February 1, 2016.

He is the incumbent representative of the Lone District of Marinduque and chairman of the House Committee on Energy. He is also the chairman of the Oversight Committee on Solid Waste Management Act and co-chairman of the Joint Congressional Power Commission.

Speaker (2020–2022)

With Cayetano's refusal to honor the term-sharing agreement after 184 representatives rejected his offer of resignation on September 30, 2020 and abruptly suspending the House's session on October 6, 2020, Velasco called on Cayetano to resume the House's session before November 16, 2020. He and his allies also affirmed their intent to conduct a session on October 14, 2020 to formalize his assumption as Speaker of the House of Representatives.

During a gathering of 186 representatives at Celebrity Sports Complex in Quezon City, Velasco was elected as House Speaker on October 12, 2020, two days before the term-sharing agreement that he and Alan Peter Cayetano agreed upon in July 2019 went into effect. However, Cayetano disputed Velasco's election and called the gathering a "fake session."

On October 13, 2020, Cayetano tendered his "irrevocable resignation" as Speaker through a Facebook live stream, as 186 representatives formally ratified Velasco's election as the new Speaker in the Batasang Pambansa during the start of their special session.

On November 18, Velasco was appointed by the House as legislative caretaker of Cebu City's 1st district after the death of representative Raul del Mar two days earlier.

References

External links

1977 births
21st-century Filipino lawyers
Lakas–CMD politicians
Living people
PDP–Laban politicians
Members of the House of Representatives of the Philippines from Marinduque
Speakers of the House of Representatives of the Philippines
National Unity Party (Philippines) politicians
People from Marinduque
De La Salle University alumni
University of Santo Tomas alumni